Miresh may refer to:

Miresh, a village in the Bulqizë Municipality of eastern Albania
Meresht, a village in the Sanjabad-e Shomali Rural District of northern Iran